Ian Dickson may refer to:
Ian Dickson (footballer) (1902–1976), Scottish footballer
Ian Dickson (TV personality) (born 1963), Australian TV and radio personality and former music mogul